Nikita Aleksandrovich Dolgushin (November 8, 1938, — June 10, 2012) was a Russian Soviet ballet dancer, choreographer, teacher. He was named People's Artist of the USSR in 1988.

In 1959 he graduated from the Leningrad Choreographic School (Alexander Pushkin's course). Following graduation, Dolgushin joined Kirov Ballet and then moved to Novosibirsk. In 1961–1966, he was the leading dancer of the Novosibirsk Opera and Ballet Theatre. From 1968 to 1983 Dolgushin was a ballet dancer with the Mikhailovsky Theatre and Ballet and in 2007 returned to Saint Petersburg as a pedagogue. From 2009 to 2011 he was a chairman of the Mikhailovsky Theatre's Art Council. Throughout 15 remaining years of his life, Dolgushin served on a choreography faculty of the Saint Petersburg Conservatory.

References

External links

Сказка его жизни. Никита Долгушин.

1938 births
2012 deaths
Dancers from Saint Petersburg
Russian male ballet dancers
Soviet male ballet dancers
Ballet masters
Soviet choreographers
Russian choreographers
Ballet teachers
Mariinsky Ballet dancers
Academic staff of Saint Petersburg Conservatory
Novosibirsk Opera and Ballet Theatre
People's Artists of the USSR
People's Artists of the RSFSR
Honored Artists of the RSFSR
Vaganova graduates